Live at Celtic Connections 2000 is a live album by Scottish Celtic rock band Runrig. It marked their first appearance at Celtic Connections, a Scottish music festival which takes place annually in Glasgow during the month of January.

Track listing

 "Rocket to the Moon" – 6:39
 "Protect and Survive" – 4:19
 "Big Sky" – 7:27
 "Sìol Ghoraidh" ("The Genealogy of Goraidh") – 6:52
 "The Only Rose" – 5:24
 "A Dh'innse na Fìrinn" ("To Tell You the Truth") – 5:29
 "Edge of the World" – 5:36
 "Hearts of Olden Glory" – 4:45
 "Rubh nan Cudaigean" ("Cuddy Point") / "The Middleton Mouse" – 3:18
 "Maymorning" – 5:48
 "The Message" – 5:33
 "Cearcall a' Chuain" ("The Ocean Circle") – 3:13
 "Pòg Aon Oidhche Earraich" ("A Kiss One Spring Evening") – 4:25
 "Skye" – 10:05

Personnel
Runrig
 Iain Bayne - drums
 Bruce Guthro - vocals, acoustic guitar
 Malcolm Jones - guitars, pipes, accordion, vocals
 Calum Macdonald - percussion, vocals
 Rory Macdonald - bass guitar, vocals, acoustic guitar
 Peter Wishart - keyboards

Runrig albums
2000 live albums
Scottish Gaelic music